Cymbidium dayanum, the Day's cymbidium, is a species of orchid, also known as the phoenix orchid or tree orchid.

dayanum
Plants described in 1869